{{DISPLAYTITLE:C17H16ClN3O2}}
The molecular formula C17H16ClN3O2 (molar mass: 329.781 g/mol) may refer to:

 Carburazepam
 7-Hydroxyamoxapine

Molecular formulas